Kern Canyon is a canyon and stream in Stanislaus County, California. The mouth of the stream of Kern Canyon is located at an elevation of  just beyond the mouth of the Canyon on the west side of Interstate 5 in California.

References

Rivers of San Joaquin County, California
Rivers of Stanislaus County, California
Tributaries of the San Joaquin River
Diablo Range
Geography of the San Joaquin Valley
Rivers of Northern California